Culleoka Methodist Episcopal Church, South is a historic church on Quality Street in Culleoka, Tennessee.

It was built in 1868. In 1870 it became the first location of what was to become the Webb School, when W. R. "Sawney" Webb and his brother taught classes in the church basement. The church was added to the National Register of Historic Places in 1986.

References

Methodist churches in Tennessee
Churches on the National Register of Historic Places in Tennessee
Churches in Maury County, Tennessee
National Register of Historic Places in Maury County, Tennessee